Bayatan or Beyatan or Biatan, also rendered as Bayatun or Beyatun or Biatun or Biyatun, may refer to:
Biatan-e Olya, a village in Hamadan Province, Iran
Biatan-e Sofla, a village in Hamadan Province, Iran
Bayatan, Borujerd, a village in Borujerd County, Lorestan Province, Iran
Bayatan, Dorud, a village in Dorud County, Lorestan Province, Iran
Bayatan, Markazi, a village in Markazi Province, Iran